A Man's Work may refer to:

 A Man's Work, a 1967 book by Gordon Lish
 A Man's Work (film), a 2007 Finnish film

also

 Man's Work, a UK television series